Vaatsalya Public School is a co-educational English medium school in Bangalore, India. The school offers education from pre-nursery to VIII standard. The medium of instruction is English. Kannada and Hindi are being taught as second languages.

External links 
 

Schools in Bangalore
Educational institutions established in 2006
2006 establishments in Karnataka